Alberto "Berto" Cayarga Fernández (born 17 September 1996) is a Spanish professional footballer who plays as a winger for Polish club Radomiak Radom.

Club career
Born in Avilés, Asturias, Cayarga joined Sporting de Gijón's youth setup in 2014, after already making his senior debut with SD Llano 2000. In July 2015, after finishing his formation, he was loaned to Tercera División side UP Langreo for one year.

Upon returning, Cayarga agreed to a two-year contract and was assigned to the reserves, now also in the fourth tier. He helped the B-team in their promotion in his first season, and scored a career-best nine goals in his second, as his side missed out a second consecutive promotion in the play-offs.

On 7 August 2018, Cayarga signed a two-year deal with Segunda División B side Racing de Santander. He was a first-choice for the Cantabrian side, which achieved promotion to Segunda División.

Cayarga made his professional debut on 17 August 2019, starting in a 0–1 home loss against Málaga CF. The following 31 January, he terminated his contract with Racing, and signed a six-month deal with third division side FC Cartagena, with option for a further year, just hours later.

Cayarga scored his first professional goal on 6 February 2021, netting his team's second in a 2–0 home win over Real Oviedo.

On 3 January 2023, Cayarga joined Polish Ekstraklasa side Radomiak Radom on a deal until the end of the season with an extension option.

References

External links
 
 
 

1996 births
Living people
People from Avilés
Spanish footballers
Footballers from Asturias
Association football wingers
Segunda División players
Segunda División B players
Tercera División players

Divisiones Regionales de Fútbol players
Sporting de Gijón B players
UP Langreo footballers
Racing de Santander players
FC Cartagena footballers
Radomiak Radom players
Spanish expatriate footballers
Expatriate footballers in Poland
Spanish expatriate sportspeople in Poland